Fraxinus gooddingii, the  Tiburón ash or Goodding's ash, is a tree native to Sonora and southern Arizona. It is reported from Cochise and Santa Cruz Counties in Arizona, and from numerous locations in Sonora (including Isla Tiburón, Shark Island in the Gulf of California).

References

Flora of Arizona
Flora of Sonora
Gulf of California
gooddingii
Flora of the Sierra Madre Occidental